Gilford Island/Health Bay Water Aerodrome  is located adjacent to Gilford Island, British Columbia, Canada, near the Kwakwaka'wakw village of Gwayasdums.

See also
Gilford Island/Echo Bay Water Aerodrome

References

Seaplane bases in British Columbia
Registered aerodromes in British Columbia
Central Coast of British Columbia